This is a list of the names of the bodies of the European Union in its official languages.

 
European Union-related lists